After Innocence is a 2005 American documentary film about men who were exonerated from death row by DNA evidence. Directed by Jessica Sanders, the film took the Special Jury Prize at the 2005 Sundance Film Festival.

The featured exonerees are Dennis Maher; Calvin Willis; Scott Hornoff; Wilton Dedge; Vincent Moto; Nick Yarris; Ronald Cotton; and Herman Atkins. Also featured are Barry Scheck and Peter Neufeld of the Innocence Project and Lola Vollen of the Life After Exoneration Program.

Awards
Sundance Film Festival—Special Jury Prize; Grand Jury Prize (nominated)
Seattle International Film Festival—Women in Cinema Lena Sharpe Award
Newport Beach Film Festival—Special Jury Prize
Independent Film Festival of Boston—Audience Award
Full Frame Documentary Film Festival—Content + Intent = Change Award
Nantucket Film Festival—Best Storytelling In A Documentary

See also
 List of wrongful convictions in the United States
 Innocence Project
 List of miscarriage of justice cases
 Race in the United States criminal justice system
 Capital punishment in the United States
 Innocent prisoner's dilemma
 Miscarriage of justice
 False confession
 Overturned convictions in the United States
 Capital punishment debate in the United States
 List of exonerated death row inmates

References

External links
Homepage
After Innocence at Working Films
"For the Wrongly Convicted, New Trials Once the Cell Opens", The New York Times, January 25, 2005. (PDF link)
 

2005 films
American documentary films
Films scored by Charles Bernstein
Sundance Film Festival award winners
Documentary films about capital punishment in the United States
2005 documentary films
Wrongful convictions
2000s English-language films
2000s American films